Alonso de Escobar y Cáceres (16th Century) was a Spanish military, Conquistador, Alcalde, Regidor and Lieutenant governor of Asuncion and Buenos Aires.

Biography 

Born in Extremadura, was the son of Juan de Escobar. In 1555, the sergeant Escobar y Cáceres arrived to Paraguay, in the army of Juan de Sanabria. Alonso de Escobar y Cáceres had a natural son Alonso de Escobar (Regidor of Buenos Aires).

References

External links 
paseovirtual.net

1500s births
1500s deaths
16th-century explorers
People from Asunción
Spanish colonial governors and administrators